Marcia nuziale is a 1965 Italian film directed by Marco Ferreri.

Cast
Ugo Tognazzi
Shirley Anne Field
Alexandra Stewart
Gaia Germani
Catherine Faillot
Tecla Scarano
Gianni Bonagura
Julia Drago
Tom Felleghy

References

External links
 

1965 films
Italian comedy films
1960s Italian-language films
Films directed by Marco Ferreri
Films with screenplays by Rafael Azcona
1960s Italian films